
This is a list of past and present members of the Académie des Beaux-Arts in section VII: Artistic creation in the cinema and audio-visual fields.

Seat #1 
 elected 1975: Henri Sauguet (1901–1989)
 1990: Jean Prodromidès (1927–2016)
This seat was transferred to section V in 1998.

Seat #2 
 
 1979: Marcel Carné (1906–1996)
 1998: Roman Polanski (born 1933)

Seat #3 
 1986: René Clément (1913–1996)
 1998: Gérard Oury (1919–2006)
 2007: Jean-Jacques Annaud (born 1943)

Seat #4 
 1988: Pierre Schoendoerffer (1928–2012)
 2018: Coline Serreau (born 1947)

Seat #5 

 1988: Claude Autant-Lara (1901–2000)
 2002: Francis Girod (1948–2006)
 2016: Jacques Perrin (born 1941)

Seat #6 
 1999: Henri Verneuil (1920–2002)
 2007: Régis Wargnier (born 1947)

Seat #7 
 2000: Jeanne Moreau (1928–2017)
 2019: Frédéric Mitterrand (born 1947)

Sources
 List of members @ the Académie des Beaux-Arts website.

See also
List of Académie des Beaux-Arts members: Painting
List of Académie des Beaux-Arts members: Sculpture
List of Académie des Beaux-Arts members: Architecture
List of Académie des Beaux-Arts members: Engraving
List of Académie des Beaux-Arts members: Music
List of Académie des Beaux-Arts members: Unattached

 Cinema
French directors
Lists of French people
Lists of film directors